The sacral spinal nerve 4 (S4) is a spinal nerve of the sacral segment.

It originates from the spinal column from below the 4th body of the sacrum

Muscles
S4 supplies many muscles, either directly or through nerves originating from S4. They are not innervated with S4 as single origin, but partly by S4 and partly by other spinal nerves. The muscles are:
 iliococcygeus
 puborectalis
 coccygeus
 Sphincter ani externus muscle
 sphincter urethrae membranaceae

Additional Images

References

Spinal nerves